The men's 800 metres at the 2008 Summer Olympics took place from 20–23 August at the Beijing National Stadium. Fifty-eight athletes from 40 nations competed. The qualifying standards were 1:46.00 (A standard) and 1:47.00 (B standard). The final on 23 August resulted in a triumph for Kenyan runner Wilfred Bungei in an official time of 1:44.65. It was the first victory in the event for Kenya since 1992 and the third overall. Ismail Ahmed Ismail's silver medal was Sudan's first Olympic medal in any competition.

Summary

Along the way to the final, defending champion Yuriy Borzakovskiy was eliminated as his fast closing tactics didn't get him into a qualifying place or time.  In the final, most of the field got off fairly evenly, with Ismail Ahmed Ismail showing the least interest in joining the pack of seven.  By 200 metres, Wilfred Bungei, wearing sunglasses in the Beijing night, had found his way to the lead with his Kenyan teammate Alfred Kirwa Yego protecting him on his shoulder.  Ismail joined the back of the pack and without leaving the rail, almost casually worked his way to being a step behind Bungei at the end of the first lap.  Bungei and the field accelerated on the back stretch with Ismail staying on the rail running into a box inside of Yego.  As Yego faltered through the final turn, Yeimer López ran around him into the perfect strategic position, still leaving Ismail boxed into no-mans land.  Coming off the turn, Ismail simply ran faster and ran out of the trap, López was out of gas.  Bungei took off into a sprint with his right arm flapping, opening up two metres on Ismail, who drifted out to lane 2 for clear running.  Ten metres before the finish, Bungei let up and coasted over the finish line, Ismail tried to pass, dipping at the line but Bungei's lead was just enough to hold onto gold.  In the final rush for bronze, Kenyan mercenary running for Bahrain Yusuf Saad Kamel looked to have the edge, but Yego moved out to lane 3 to avoid López and run down Kamel.  With a final rush, Gary Reed caught Kamel at the line, still a step behind Yego.

Background

This was the 26th appearance of the event, which is one of 12 athletics events to have been held at every Summer Olympics. Five of the finalists from 2004 returned, including the champion: gold medalist Yuriy Borzakovskiy of Russia, silver medalist Mbulaeni Mulaudzi of South Africa, fourth-place finisher Mouhssin Chehibi of Morocco, fifth-place finisher Wilfred Bungei of Kenya, and eight-place finisher Ismail Ahmed Ismail of Sudan. Alfred Kirwa Yego of Kenya was the 2007 world champion and was expected to compete with his countryman Bungei and the Sudanese team (including Ismail and 2008 world list leader Abubaker Kaki Khamis) for the medals.

Guam, Samoa, and Slovakia appeared in the event for the first time. Great Britain made its 25th appearance, most among all nations, having had no competitors in the event only in the 1904 Games in St. Louis.

Qualification

Each National Olympic Committee (NOC) was able to enter up to three entrants providing they had met the A qualifying standard (1:46.00) in the qualifying period (1 January 2007 to 23 July 2008). The maximum number of athletes per nation had been set at 3 since the 1930 Olympic Congress. NOCs were also permitted to enter one athlete providing he had met the B standard (1:47.00) in the same qualifying period.

Competition format

The men's 800 metres returned to a smaller field (58 athletes in 2008, compared to 72 in 2004 and 61 in 2000). It again used a three-round format, the most common format since 1912 though there had been variations. The "fastest loser" system introduced in 1964 was used for the first two rounds. There were eight first-round heats, each with 7 or 8 athletes; the top two runners in each heat as well as the next eight fastest overall advanced to the semifinals. There were three semifinals with 8 athletes each; the top two runners in each semifinal and the next two fastest overall advanced to the eight-man final.

Records
Prior to this competition, the existing world and Olympic records were as follows:

No new world or Olympic records were set for this event. The following national records were established during the competition:

Schedule

All times are China Standard Time (UTC+8)

Results

Round 1
The first round was held on 20 August. The first two runners of each heat (Q) plus the next eight overall fastest runners (q) qualified for the second round.

Heat 1

Heat 2

Heat 3

Heat 4

Heat 5

Heat 6

Heat 7

Heat 8

Overall results for round 1

Semifinals

Qual. rule: first 2 of each heat (Q) plus the 2 fastest times (q) qualified.

Semifinal 1

21 August 2008 - 19:50

Semifinal 2

21 August 2008 - 19:58

Semifinal 3

21 August 2008 - 20:06

Final

23 August 2008 - 19:30

 Splits

References

Athletics at the 2008 Summer Olympics
800 metres at the Olympics
Men's events at the 2008 Summer Olympics